Kim Du-han (May 15, 1918 – November 21, 1972), also spelled Kim Doo-han, was a South Korean mobster, anti-communist activist, politician and the son of Kim Chwa-chin. His pen name (ho) was Uisong. He was notorious for right-wing terrorism against communists or pro-North Korean left-wing peoples, but showed complex tendencies, such as sympathizing with Democratic liberalism and (moderate anti-communist) democratic socialism.

Life

Career
Kim Du-han was the leader of the Jongro street gang during the time under the Japanese rule. He was considered to be the greatest fist fighter in Korea during his time.

After the end of Imperial Japanese rule in Korea, Kim joined Syngman Rhee's Liberal Party, where he served as a politician. He was elected to the Third National Assembly in 1954 and the Sixth National Assembly in 1965.

Personal life
Kim Du-han was the father of South Korean politician, Kim Eul-dong, and the grandfather to her son, South Korean actor Song Il-gook.

In popular culture
 Portrayed by Park Sang-min in the General's Son trilogy.
 Kim was portrayed by Ahn Jae-mo and Kim Yeong-cheol) in the 2002 SBS TV series Rustic Period.
 Portrayed by Song Il-gook in the MBC TV series This Man.

External links
 Kim Du-han  
 야인시대  

1918 births
1972 deaths
South Korean gangsters
Andong Kim clan
South Korean anti-communists
Anti-communist terrorism
Members of the National Assembly (South Korea)
South Korean Buddhists